Crassispira armoricensis is an extinct species of sea snail, a marine gastropod mollusk in the family Pseudomelatomidae, the turrids and allies.

Description

Distribution
Fossils have been found in Eocene strata in Loire-Atlantique, France

References

 Cossmann (M.), 1896 Mollusques éocèniques de la Loire-Inférieure. Tome 1, fascicule 2. Bulletin de la Société des Sciences Naturelles de l'Ouest de la France, t. 6, vol. 4, p. 180-246

armoricensis
Gastropods described in 1896